The First Reformed Church, historically known as the Dutch Reformed Church, is located in New Brunswick, New Jersey on 160 Neilson Street. It is adjacent to the First Reformed Church Cemetery in the churchyard. The education building is located next to the sanctuary building with the street address being 9 Bayard Street.

History
The congregation was formed in 1717. The church building was constructed in 1812. In 1971 the church was set on fire.

Notable burials
 Jacob Rutsen Hardenbergh, first President of Queen's College (now Rutgers University)
 Ira Condict, third President of Queen's College (now Rutgers University)
 Theodore Frelinghuysen, United States Senator from New Jersey, seventh President of Queen's College (now Rutgers University)

Gallery

References

External links 
 
 
 

Reformed Church in America churches in New Jersey
National Register of Historic Places in Middlesex County, New Jersey
Churches on the National Register of Historic Places in New Jersey
Historic American Buildings Survey in New Jersey
Cemeteries in Middlesex County, New Jersey
Churches in New Brunswick, New Jersey
1812 establishments in New Jersey
1717 establishments in New Jersey